Takali Dhokeshwar is a village in Ahmednagar District, Maharashtra, India. It is located at the intersection of the Mumbai - Vishakhapattanam highway (National Highway 61) and the Satara - Nashik road (State Highway 50).

Education

Schools
 Jawahar Navodaya Vidyalaya, Ahmednagar|Javahar Navodaya Vidyalaya (CBSE Board) Provides education from 6th standard to 12th standard.
  Jilha Parishad Primary School, Bet Wasti
sampada pratithan ahmednagar krushi vidyalaya
 Ahmednagar Sanchalit Krushi Tantra Vidyalaya.
 Sanskar Public School, Takali Dhokeshwar (Kailas Zaware)
 Sawali School of Nursing
 Rayat shikshan santha's Shree Prabhakarao Ganpat Khilari Vidya Mandir (previously known as Kanya Vidya Mandir)
 AJMVPS's Shri Dhokeshwar Vidyalaya
 Priyadarshani public school
 Jilha parishad primary school dhokeshwar vasti
 AJMVPS's Shri Dhokeshwar Junior college (ARTS AND SCIENCE)

Colleges
 AJMVPS's Shri Dhokeshwar College, Takali Dhokeshwar (NAAC B GRADE CGPA 2.21 ACCREDIATED IN 2017, AFFILIATED TO SAVITRIBAI PHULE PUNE UNIVERSITY, PUNE)
 AJMVPS's Shri Dhokeshwar Junior College Takali Dhokeshwar.
 Adarsha D. T. Ed. College
Sampada Pratisthan’s Adarsha D.T.Ed. College provides education in D.T.Ed. (Teacher Education-2 years duration diploma) in Marathi medium.
 Sanskar Public School 
Ahmednagar Jilha Maratha Vidya Prasarak Samaj's Shri Dhokeshwar College  is affiliated to University of Pune. It is established in 1994

shops
 Ujwal Collection (उज्वल कलेक्शन) 
 Ujwal Agro Agency (उज्वल अग्रो एजेन्सी) since 1995

Computer dealer
 Nutan Computers
 Vision Computers Institute  'Address -Navodya Road, Takali Dhokeshwar,Mob- 9604401781'''
 Guarav Computer Mob 940540238 / 9421590799

Maha e Sewa Kendra Takali Dhokeshwar 
Near Sawali Pathsanstha Takali Dhokeshwar 
Mob No 7588539729
SBI Grahak Sewa Kendra Takali Dhokeshwar 
Mob No 7588539729

Finance

Banking and finance
 State Bank of India
 Ahmednagar District Central Co-Operative Bank
 Devkrupa Pansanstha
 Gurudatta Multistate Co- op So Ltd
 Kanhur Pathar Patsanstha
 Mauli Patsanstha
 Nandkumar Patsanstha
 Parner Gramin Patsanstha, Branch: Takali Dhokeshwar
 Raje Shivaji Patsanstha
 Sahkari Patsanstha
 Sampada Patsanstha
 Sanmitra Patsanstha
 Sawali Patsanstha
 Shree Dhokeshwar Sahakari Patsanstha

Religion
The majority of the population in Takali Dhokeshwar is Hindu. But also there are few Muslims. There are several temples and Church masque in the village.

Temples
 Shree Dhokeshwar Temple
 Banai Devi Mandir
 Shri Bhairavnath Mandir, Bande Mala
 Datta Mandir
 Hanuman Mandir Bet Wasti, Takali Dhokeshwar
 Bhausaheb Maharaj Temple
 Lord Shiva Temple
 Malaganga Mandir
 Muktai Mandir, Zawar patti
 Takali Dhokeshwar Barav
 Mote Baba (peer devasthan)
Nilkantheshwar Temple
 Veer (peer devasthan Dhus wasti)

Places of interest
Takali Dhokeshwar is good place for the tourist. Following are some of the good places of interest
 Shree Dhokeshwar Temple Caves
The caves near the Dhokeshwar temple are from 5th century
 Khandoba Mandir (on the Tandala Mountain)

NGO's in Takli Dhokeshwar 

 Prabodhini Sanstha.
 Grambharti Mahila  Mandal.
 Leader's Prabodhini.
 phoenix old age home
 Amhi Takalikar Gram Vikas Pratishthan

See also
 Wasunde
 Karjule Hareshwar
 Kasare
 Parner
 Pokhari
 Villages in Parner tehsil
 Palashi

References 

Villages in Ahmednagar district
Villages in Parner taluka
Cities and towns in Ahmednagar district